Tropomodulin 2 (neuronal) also known as TMOD2 is a protein which in humans is encoded by the TMOD2 gene.

Function 

This gene encodes a neuronal-specific member of the tropomodulin family of actin-regulatory proteins. The encoded protein caps the pointed end of actin filaments preventing both elongation and depolymerization. The capping activity of this protein is dependent on its association with tropomyosin. Alternatively spliced transcript variants encoding different isoforms have been described.

References

Further reading

Tropomodulin